The Abako was a small 129cc single-cylinder machine built between 1923 and 1925, which was powered by Abako's own two-stroke deflector-type three-port engines, two and three-speed Sturmey-Archer gearboxes and chain drive to the rear wheel.

References

External links
 Picture

Motorcycle manufacturers of Germany